South African National Parks (SANParks) is the body responsible for managing South Africa's national parks.

Many parks offer a variety of accommodations. Kruger National Park and Table Mountain National Park are two of South Africa's most visited tourist attractions.

Though not designated as National Parks, other protected areas exist, such as game and nature reserves.

List of parks administered by SANParks
The following are designated as National Parks of South Africa:

Location of national parks

See also 
 
 Ezemvelo KZN Wildlife – The body responsible for maintaining wilderness areas and public nature reserves in KwaZulu-Natal
 Eastern Cape Parks – The body responsible for maintaining wilderness areas and public nature reserves in the Eastern Cape
 Gauteng Department of Agriculture, Conservation, Environment and Land Affairs – The government department responsible for maintaining wilderness areas and public nature reserves in Gauteng.
 Mpumalanga Parks Board – The body responsible for maintaining wilderness areas and public nature reserves in Mpumalanga
 North West Parks and Tourism Board – The body responsible for maintaining wilderness areas and public nature reserves in the North West
 Cape Nature – The body responsible for maintaining wilderness areas and public nature reserves in the Western Cape

Notes

References

External links 

 South African National Parks
 Interview with Head, Business Development, South African National Parks 

 
National park administrators
Organizations established in 1926
Parks
Lists of tourist attractions in South Africa
1926 establishments in South Africa
Lists of national parks